"Perso nel buio" is a song by Italian singer Sangiovanni, with featured vocals by Madame. It was released on 12 November 2021 by Sugar Music and included in the re-release of Sangiovanni's debut EP Sangiovanni.

Music video
The music video for "Perso nel buio", directed by Attilio Cusani, was released on 18 November 2021 via Sangiovanni's YouTube channel.

Charts

Certifications

References

2021 songs
2021 singles
Madame (singer) songs
Sangiovanni songs
Sugar Music singles